Acanthopteroctetes unifascia is a moth of the family Acanthopteroctetidae. It was described by Davis in 1978. It is found in Montana.

The wingspan is about 11 mm for males. The forewings are fuscous with a slight coppery luster and with three large, pale yellowish spots. The hindwings are slightly paler and the scales here are narrower. Adults are on wing in July, probably in one generation per year.

References

Moths described in 1978
Moths of North America
Natural history of Montana
Acanthoctesia
Taxa named by Donald R. Davis (entomologist)